Nasir ad-Dīn was a small Palestinian Arab village  southwest of Tiberias, on the crest of a slope that overlooks the Sea of Galilee. The village had several springs to the east, south, and southeast. In the  1931 British census  179 people lived there, decreasing to 90 in a 1945 census. Nasir ad-Din and nearby al-Manara were in the same jurisdiction with 4,185 dunams of land, most of which was allocated to cereals.

History
Archeological excavations has shown that the place was inhabited in the Hellenistic era, and that a major settlement was here during the Roman era, in 2nd to 4th century CE.

Nasir ad-Din is named after a shrine dedicated to Nasir ad-Din, an Ayyubid general who died while fighting the Crusaders and buried to the north of the village, according to local legend. A kilometer to the west is the shrine for another Muslim soldier who died fighting the Crusaders, named Sheikh al-Qaddumi.

British Mandate era
In the 1922 census of Palestine, conducted  by the British Mandate authorities,  Nasir al Din had a  population of 109, all Muslims, increasing in the 1931 census to 179, still all Muslims, in  35 houses.

During the British Mandate in Palestine, most of Nasir ad-Din's houses were scattered north-south, with no particular village plan. The inhabitants worked in agriculture and animal breeding.

In the 1944/1945 statistics the population consisted of 90 Muslims, and together with the people of Al-Manara  they had 4,185 dunams of land.  Of this,  4,172  dunams  of land were used for cereals, while 13 dunams were classified as built-up (urban) area.

1948 War
On April 12, 1948, the 12th battalion of Israel's Golani Brigade captured Nasir ad-Din to cut off Tiberias from major Arab centers to the west (Nazareth and Lubya). The skirmish lasted four hours because the Haganah encountered unexpected local resistance, but eventually most of the inhabitants fled to Tiberias or Lubya — British troops escorted villagers to Lubya. During the battle 22 Arabs were killed, six were wounded, and three were captured. The civilian deaths included seven men, at least one woman, and a number of children. Two Haganah troops were also wounded. The capture and killing in Nasir ad-Din was a decisive factor for the flight of Arabs from Tiberias, and was a major demoralizing factor for Arab forces. All the houses were destroyed, and residents that remained were expelled on April 23.

References

Bibliography

External links
Welcome to Nasir-al-Din
Nasir al-Din, Zochrot
Survey of Western Palestine, Map 6:  IAA, Wikimedia commons 
Nasir al-Din, from Khalil Sakakini Cultural Centre

Arab villages depopulated prior to the 1948 Arab–Israeli War
District of Tiberias
Sea of Galilee